Events from the year 1405 in France

Incumbents
 Monarch – Charles VI

Events
 6 May - Siege of Mercq takes place between France and England during the Hundred Years War
 Unknown - Christine de Pizan writes The Book of the City of Ladies

Births

Deaths
 29 May - Philippe de Mézières, royal advisor (born 1327)

References

1400s in France